Judith Mary Cummins (née Black) (born 26 June 1967) is a British Labour Party politician. She has been Member of Parliament (MP) for Bradford South since May 2015.

Personal life
Cummins was born on 26 June 1967 and was educated at Ruskin College and the University of Leeds, attending college as a mature student on a Trade Union scholarship. She has two children.

Political career
Cummins was first elected as a local councillor on Bradford Council in 2004, representing the Royds ward. She served a full three-year term before not standing again at the 2007 election. Cummins was later elected as a Leeds City Councillor to represent Temple Newsam ward for a full four-year term from 2012 to 2016.

In advance of the 2015 general election, Cummins contested for selection as the prospective parliamentary candidate in the two constituencies she had been previously elected as a local ward councillor. Despite being an incumbent councillor representing Temple Newsam ward in the constituency, Cummins lost the selection for Leeds East to Richard Burgon. She was later selected by Bradford South Constituency Labour Party to stand for the seat to replace Gerry Sutcliffe.

Member of Parliament
Cummins was elected to the House of Commons to represent Bradford South on 7 May 2015, increasing the Labour candidate's majority in the constituency from 4,622 to 6,450 votes.

She supported Owen Smith in the failed attempt to replace Jeremy Corbyn in the 2016 Labour leadership election.

Cummins increased her majority 250 votes to 6,700 at the 2017 general election before it fell to her current seat majority of 2,346 when re-elected in 2019.

On 19 July 2021, she was appointed Acting Deputy Speaker of the House of Commons in place of Dame Rosie Winterton who was self-isolating due to COVID-19, and she held the position till the summer recess.

References

External links 

 
 
 

1967 births
Living people
Alumni of the University of Leeds
Female members of the Parliament of the United Kingdom for English constituencies
Labour Party (UK) MPs for English constituencies
Politicians from Bradford
UK MPs 2015–2017
UK MPs 2017–2019
UK MPs 2019–present
Councillors in Leeds
21st-century British women politicians
21st-century English women
21st-century English people
Women councillors in England